Autophagy is a monthly peer-reviewed scientific journal covering all aspects of cell autophagy. It is published by Taylor & Francis and the editor-in-chief is Daniel J. Klionsky (University of Michigan).

Abstracting and indexing
The journal is abstracted and indexed in:

According to the Journal Citation Reports, the journal has a 2020 impact factor of 16.016 and a five year impact factor of 16.586 (2020) .

See also
Nature Communications
PNAS
Traffic Journal
Cell Biology International
Cell and Tissue Research
Cell Cycle

References

External links 

Molecular and cellular biology journals
Publications established in 2005
English-language journals
Taylor & Francis academic journals
Monthly journals